Bernard Perret (born 5 June 1933) is a French alpine skier. He competed in the men's slalom at the 1956 Winter Olympics.

References

1933 births
Living people
French male alpine skiers
Olympic alpine skiers of France
Alpine skiers at the 1956 Winter Olympics
People from Chamonix
Sportspeople from Haute-Savoie